Events from 1566 in the Kingdom of Scotland'''.

Incumbents
Monarch – Mary I

Events
 9 March – David Rizzio is murdered in front of Mary, Queen of Scots at Holyrood Palace in Edinburgh by a group of nobles led by Patrick Ruthven, 3rd Lord Ruthven with the support of Mary's husband Henry Stuart, Lord Darnley.
 11 March – Mary escapes to Dunbar Castle after convincing Lord Darnley to help her.
 18 March – Mary returns to Edinburgh with an army raised by James Hepburn, 4th Earl of Bothwell.
 April – Mary takes up residence at Edinburgh Castle in preparation to give birth.
 19 June – Mary gives birth to her son James at Edinburgh Castle.
 17 December – James is baptised at Stirling Castle.

Births
 19 June – James VI and I, King of Scotland from 1567 and King of England and Ireland from 1603 (died 1625 in England)
 James Sempill, courtier and poet (died 1626)

Deaths
 9 March – David Rizzio, Italian courtier (born 1533 in the Duchy of Savoy)

References

1566 in Scotland